Simon Simoni (born 14 July 2004) is an Albanian professional footballer who plays as a goalkeeper for German  club Eintracht Frankfurt.

Club career
On 1 January 2023, Simoni signed for Bundesliga club Eintracht Frankfurt on a four-and-a-half year contract.

Career statistics

Club

Notes

References

2004 births
People from Lezhë
Living people
Albanian footballers
Albania youth international footballers
Albania under-21 international footballers
Association football goalkeepers
KF Shënkolli players
FK Dinamo Tirana players
Eintracht Frankfurt players
Kategoria e Parë players
Kategoria Superiore players
Albanian expatriate footballers
Expatriate footballers in Germany
Albanian expatriate sportspeople in Germany